Aphanotorulus horridus is a species of catfish in the family Loricariidae. It is native to South America, where it occurs in the Madeira River basin. The species reaches 35.5 cm (14 inches) SL. It is thought to be a facultative air-breather.

A. horridus was originally described as Hypostomus horridus by Rudolf Kner in 1854, although it was transferred to the genus Squaliforma (now considered invalid) after the genus' designation by I. J. H. Isbrücker, I. Seidel, J. Michels, E. Schraml, and A. Werner in 2001. In 2004, Jonathan W. Armbruster classified the species within Hypostomus instead of Squaliforma. In 2016, following a review of Isorineloricaria and Aphanotorulus by C. Keith Ray and Armbruster (both of Auburn University), the species was reclassified as a member of Aphanotorulus, although FishBase still lists the species as Squaliforma horrida. This 2016 review also found three other former Squaliforma species (S. biseriata, S. scopularia, and S. virescens) to be synonymous with A. horridus.

A. horridus sometimes appears in the aquarium trade, where it is typically referred to either as the long-head pleco or by one of two associated L-numbers, which are L-290 and L-291.

References 

Loricariidae
Fish described in 1854
Catfish of South America